The East African Athletics Championships, also known as the Zone V Championships, was an international athletics competition between East African nations, organised by the Confederation of African Athletics (CAA). It was established in 1995, the same year as two other regional championships: the West and North African Athletics Championships and the African Southern Region Athletics Championships. The competition succeeded the East and Central African Championships as the premier regional athletics competition for the region. All the events at the championships were in outdoor track and field.

Editions

Events
The competition programme featured 32 regular athletics events: seven track running events, two obstacle events, three jumps, and four throws for both the sexes.

Track running
100 metres, 200 metres, 400 metres, 800 metres, 1500 metres, 5000 metres, 10,000 metres
Obstacle events
100 metres hurdles (women only), 110 metres hurdles (men only), 400 metres hurdles, 3000 metres steeplechase (men only)
Jumping events
High jump, long jump, triple jump
Throwing events
Shot put, discus throw, javelin throw, hammer throw (men only)
Relay events
4 × 100 metres relay, 4 × 400 metres relay

Several events were held irregularly. Women did not compete in the steeplechase or hammer throw, and pole vault was not available as an event for either sex.

Participation

Champions

Men's 100 metres
1995: 
2001: 
2003: 
2005:

Men's 200 metres
1995: 
2001: ?
2003: 
2005: ?

Men's 400 metres
1995: 
2001: 
2003: 
2005:

Men's 800 metres
1995: 
2001: ?
2003: 
2005: ?

Men's 1500 metres
1995: 
2001: 
2003: 
2005: ?

Men's 5000 metres
1995: 
2001: 
2003: 
2005: ?

Men's 10,000 metres
1995: 
2001: 
2003: 
2005:

Men's 3000 metres steeplechase
1995: 
2001: ?
2003: Not held
2005: ?

Men's 110 metres hurdles
1995: 
2001: ?
2003: Not held
2005: ?

Men's 400 metres hurdles
1995: 
2001: ?
2003: Not held
2005:

Men's high jump
1995: 
2001: ?
2003: 
2005: ?

Men's long jump
1995: 
2001: 
2003: 
2005: ?

Men's triple jump
1995: 
2001: ?
2003: Not held
2005: ?

Men's shot put
1995: 
2001: 
2003: 
2005: ?

Men's discus throw
1995: 
2001: 
2003: Not held
2005: ?

Men's hammer throw
1995: 
2001: ?
2003: Not held
2005: ?

Men's javelin throw
1995: 
2001: 
2003: 
2005: ?

Men's 4 × 100 metres relay
1995: 
2001: ?
2003: 
2005: ?

Men's 4 × 400 metres relay
1995: 
2001: 
2003: 
2005: ?

Women's 100 metres
1995: 
2001: ?
2003: 
2005: ?

Women's 200 metres
1995: 
2001: 
2003: 
2005: ?

Women's 400 metres
1995: 
2001: ?
2003: 
2005:

Women's 800 metres
1995: 
2001: 
2003: 
2005:

Women's 1500 metres
1995: 
2001: ?
2003: 
2005: ?

Women's 5000 metres
1995: 
2001: 
2003: 
2005:

Women's 10,000 metres
1995: 
2001: ?
2003: Not held
2005: ?

Women's 110 metres hurdles
1995: 
2001: ?
2003: Not held
2005: ?

Women's 400 metres hurdles
1995: 
2001: ?
2003: Not held
2005:

Women's high jump
1995: 
2001: ?
2003: Not held
2005: ?

Women's long jump
1995: 
2001: ?
2003: Not held
2005: ?

Women's triple jump
1995: 
2001: ?
2003: Not held
2005: ?

Women's shot put
1995: 
2001: 
2003: 
2005: ?

Women's discus throw
1995: 
2001: 
2003: Not held
2005: ?

Women's javelin throw
1995: 
2001: ?
2003: Not held
2005: ?

Women's 4 × 100 metres relay
1995: 
2001: 
2003: 
2005: ?

Women's 4 × 400 metres relay
1995: 
2001: ?
2003: 
2005:

References

Confederation of African Athletics competitions
Sport in East Africa
International athletics competitions
Biennial athletics competitions
Defunct athletics competitions
Recurring sporting events established in 1995
Recurring sporting events disestablished in 2005